Colin Goh is a Singaporean film maker, satirist and cartoonist. He was a former practicing attorney who has turned to full-time writing and illustration.

Goh first rose to prominence with his comic strip, The Concrete Jungle, which appeared on a regular basis in the Singapore tabloid, The New Paper.

In 1996, his play, The Body Politic, was performed at the Singapore Arts Festival. The play was also performed at the Royal Court Theatre in London.

He went on to set up talkingcock.com, a website which poked fun at the various idiosyncratic aspects of what it meant to be a Singaporean. The site's copious use of Singlish and occasional digs at the bureaucracies made it a popular one.

Together with his wife,  Joyceln Woo Yen Yen, they made their first full-feature film, Talking Cock (2002). They won the Montblanc award for best new screenwriters at the 54th San Sebastian International Film Festival for their second film Singapore Dreaming (2006). The couple also produce Dim Sum Warriors, a graphic novel and bilingual iPad app series about kung fu-fighting dumplings. Dim Sum Warrior was made into a Chinese musical which was produced by Stan Lai, one of China's most renowned theatre directors, and scored by Pulitzer Prize winning Chinese-born composer Du Yun. The musical debuted in 11 August 2017, to sold-out audiences at Theatre Above in China.

Goh regularly contributes satirical pieces to Singapore's 8 Days magazine. In 2014, Goh contributed a short story to the Singapore Noir anthology.

References

Anglo-Chinese School alumni
Singaporean comics artists
Singaporean film directors
Singaporean screenwriters
Singaporean people of Chinese descent
Satirists
Living people
Year of birth missing (living people)